5. Flieger Division (5th Air Division) was one of the primary divisions of the German Luftwaffe in World War II. It was formed on 1 August 1938 in Braunschweig from the Höheren Fliegerkommandeur 7. The division was redesignated 31. Flieger-Division on 1 November 1938 and was renamed 5. Flieger Division again on 1 February 1939. The division was redesignated V. Fliegerkorps on 11 October 1939 and reformed again on 19 December 1944.

Commanding officers

General Ludwig Wolff, 1 August 1938 – 31 January 1939
Generalfeldmarschall Robert Ritter von Greim, 1 September 1939 – 11 October 1939
Oberst Dr. Ernst Kühl, 19 December 1944 – 31 January 1945
Generalmajor Walter Storp, 31 January 1945 – 8 May 1945

Notes

References
 5. Flieger-Division 1938–1939 @ Lexikon der Wehrmacht
 5. Flieger-Division 1943–1945 @ Lexikon der Wehrmacht
 5. Flieger-Division 1938–1939 @ The Luftwaffe, 1933-45
 5. Flieger-Division 1943–1945 @ The Luftwaffe, 1933-45

Air divisions of the Wehrmacht Luftwaffe
Military units and formations established in 1938
Military units and formations disestablished in 1945